Bournemouth East by-election may refer to:

 1952 Bournemouth East and Christchurch by-election
 1977 Bournemouth East by-election